El Sobreviviente (English: The Survivor) is the debut solo effort by Wisin. It was originally released on February 10, 2004. It was re-released on January 30, 2007.

Track listing

Charts

References

2004 debut albums
Machete Music albums
Wisin albums